Conoeca psammogona is a species of bagworm that is known from Imerina in central Madagascar.

Biology
The length of the bag of the male is 16 mm, cylindrical, slightly narrowed anteriorly, formed of silk covered over with pinkish earth, sand grains and fragments of miscellaneous refuse.

The wingspan of male adults is 22 mm. Head, palpi, thorax are light grey sprinkled whitish.
Antennal ciliations.  Forewings rather elongate, costa moderately arched, apex obtuse, termen obliquely rounded; veins all separate; light grey sprinkled whitish; a few small darker grey spots or transverse strigulae scattered along posterior of costa and dorsum.
Cilia whitish grey. Hindwings light grey; cilia whitish grey.

See also
 List of moths of Madagascar

References
 

Psychidae
Moths described in 1931